The Wolf River (Tlingit: Ghùch Hîni) is a river in Yukon, Canada. It is in the Bering Sea drainage basin and is a left tributary of the Nisutlin River.

The river begins at a Wolf Lake, flows west and takes in its right tributary the Red River, then turns southwest and heads to its mouth at the Nisutlin River. The Nisutlin River empties via Teslin Lake, the Teslin River and the Yukon River to the Bering Sea.

Tributaries
Caribou Creek (left)
English Creek (left)
Red River (right)

See also  
List of rivers of Yukon

References

Rivers of Yukon